New York's 135th State Assembly district is one of the 150 districts in the New York State Assembly. It has been represented by Jennifer Lunsford since 2021.

Geography 
District 135 is located entirely within Monroe County, comprising the eastern portion of the county. It contains the towns of Webster, Penfield, East Rochester and Perinton.

Recent election results

2022

2020

2018

2016

2014

2012

2010

References

135
Monroe County, New York